Shane Bannon (born April 20, 1989) is a former American football fullback in the National Football League.  He was drafted by the Kansas City Chiefs out of Yale University in the seventh round (223rd pick overall) in the 2011 NFL Draft.  Bannon is the first Yale Football player to be drafted by an NFL team since the Tampa Bay Buccaneers drafted tight end Nate Lawrie in the sixth round (181st pick overall) of the 2004 NFL Draft. The Chiefs waived Bannon on September 3, 2011. After he cleared waivers, he was signed to the Chiefs practice squad. He suffered two season ending injuries in 2011 and 2012.

Early years
Shane attended Pomperaug High School in Southbury, Connecticut.

College career
Bannon attended and played college football at Yale. In 2007, he was on the junior varsity team. From 2008–2010, he contributed to the varsity team.

Personal life 
Bannon sits on The Concussion Legacy Foundation's Advisory Board.

References

External links
 
 Yale Bulldogs bio

Living people
1989 births
American football fullbacks
Kansas City Chiefs players
People from Southbury, Connecticut
Players of American football from Connecticut
Sportspeople from New Haven County, Connecticut
Yale Bulldogs football players